Ladislav Krejčí (born 5 July 1992) is a Czech professional footballer who plays as a left-winger for Sparta Prague.

Club career
On 7 July 2016, Krejčí joined Bologna permanently from Sparta Prague.

On 4 August 2020, Krejčí returned to Sparta Prague permanently from Bologna.

International career
Krejčí was part of the Czech Under-19 team that finished as runners-up in the 2011 UEFA European Under-19 Championship. He made his debut for the senior team in a 3–0 win against Slovakia in November 2012.

Career statistics

Club

International goals
Scores and results list Czech Republic's goal tally first, score column indicates score after each Krejčí goal.

Honours

Club
Sparta
 Czech First League: 2009–10, 2013–14
 Czech Cup: 2013–14

International
Czech Republic U19 
UEFA European Under-19 Championship: runner-up 2011

Individual
 Talent of the Year: 2011

References

External links
 

1992 births
Living people
Footballers from Prague
Association football midfielders
Czech footballers
Czech Republic youth international footballers
Czech Republic under-21 international footballers
Czech Republic international footballers
Czech First League players
AC Sparta Prague players
Bologna F.C. 1909 players
UEFA Euro 2016 players
Serie A players
Czech expatriate sportspeople in Italy
Expatriate footballers in Italy
Czech expatriate footballers